The economic calculation problem (sometimes abbreviated ECP) is a criticism of using economic planning as a substitute for market-based allocation of the factors of production. It was first proposed by Ludwig von Mises in his 1920 article "Economic Calculation in the Socialist Commonwealth" and later expanded upon by Friedrich Hayek.

In his first article, Mises described the nature of the price system under capitalism and described how individual subjective values (while criticizing other theories of value) are translated into the objective information necessary for rational allocation of resources in society. He argued that economy planning necessarily leads to an irrational and inefficient allocation of resources. In market exchanges, prices reflect the supply and demand of resources, labor and products. In the article, Mises focused his criticism on the deficiencies of the socialisation of capital goods, but he later went on to elaborate on various different forms of socialism in his book Socialism. He briefly mentioned the problem in the 3rd book of Human Action: a Treatise on Economics, where he also elaborated on the different types of socialism, namely the "Hindenburg" and "Lenin" models, which are uniquely different, and showing why, in his view, market socialism still falls prey to the problems that are tied to socialism.

Mises and Hayek argued that economic calculation is only possible by information provided through market prices and that bureaucratic or technocratic methods of allocation lack methods to rationally allocate resources. Mises's analysis centered on price theory while Hayek went with a more feathered analysis of information and entrepreneurship. The debate raged in the 1920s and 1930s and that specific period of the debate has come to be known by economic historians as the socialist calculation debate. Mises' initial criticism received multiple reactions and led to the conception of trial-and-error market socialism, most notably the Lange–Lerner theorem.

In the 1920 paper, Mises argued that the pricing systems in socialist economies were necessarily deficient because if a public entity owned all the means of production, no rational prices could be obtained for capital goods as they were merely internal transfers of goods and not "objects of exchange", unlike final goods. Therefore, they were unpriced and hence the system would be necessarily irrational as the central planners would not know how to allocate the available resources efficiently. He wrote that "rational economic activity is impossible in a socialist commonwealth". Mises developed his critique of socialism more completely in his 1922 book Socialism, arguing that the market price system is an expression of praxeology and can not be replicated by any form of bureaucracy.

Notable critics of both Mises's original argument and Hayek's newer proposition include Anarcho-capitalist economist Bryan Caplan, computer programmer and Marxist Paul Cockshott, as well as other communists.

Theory

Comparing heterogeneous goods 
Since capital goods and labor are highly heterogeneous (i.e. they have different characteristics that pertain to physical productivity), economic calculation requires a common basis for comparison for all forms of capital and labour.

As a means of exchange, money enables buyers to compare the costs of goods without having knowledge of their underlying factors; the consumer can simply focus on his personal cost-benefit decision. Therefore, the price system is said to promote economically efficient use of resources by agents who may not have explicit knowledge of all of the conditions of production or supply. This is called the signalling function of prices as well as the rationing function which prevents over-use of any resource.

Without the market process to fulfill such comparisons, critics of non-market socialism say that it lacks any way to compare different goods and services and would have to rely on calculation in kind. The resulting decisions, it is claimed, would therefore be made without sufficient knowledge to be considered rational.

Relating utility to capital and consumption goods 
The common basis for comparison of capital goods must also be connected to consumer welfare. It must also be able to compare the desired trade-off between present consumption and delayed consumption (for greater returns later on) via investment in capital goods. The use of money as a medium of exchange and unit of account is necessary to solve the first two problems of economic calculation. Mises (1912) applied the marginal utility theory developed by Carl Menger to money.

Marginal consumer expenditures represent the marginal utility or additional consumer satisfaction expected by consumers as they spend money. This is similar to the equi-marginal principle developed by Alfred Marshall. Consumers equalize the marginal utility (amount of satisfaction) of the last dollar spent on each good. Thus, the exchange of consumer goods establishes prices that represent the marginal utility of consumers and money is representative of consumer satisfaction.

If money is also spent on capital goods and labor, then it is possible to make comparisons between capital goods and consumer goods. The exchange of consumer and capital/labor goods does not imply that capital goods are valued accurately, only that it is possible for the valuations of capital goods to be made. These first elements of the calculation critique of socialism are the most basic element, namely economic calculation requires the use of money across all goods. This is a necessary, but not a sufficient condition for successful economic calculation. Without a price mechanism, Mises argues, socialism lacks the means to relate consumer satisfaction to economic activity. The incentive function of prices allows diffuse interests, like the interests of every household in cheap, high quality shoes to compete with the concentrated interests of the cobblers in expensive, poor quality shoes. Without it, a panel of experts set up to "rationalise production", likely closely linked to the cobblers for expertise, would tend to support the cobblers interests in a "conspiracy against the public". However, if this happens to all industries, everyone would be worse off than if they had been subject to the rigours of market competition.

The Mises theory of money and calculation conflicts directly with Marxist labour theory of value. Marxist theory allows for the possibility that labour content can serve as a common means of valuing capital goods, a position now out of favour with economists following the success of the theory of marginal utility.

Entrepreneurship 
The third condition for economic calculation is the existence of genuine entrepreneurship and market rivalry.

According to Israel Kirzner (1973) and Don Lavoie (1985), entrepreneurs reap profits by supplying unfulfilled needs in all markets. Thus, entrepreneurship brings prices closer to marginal costs. The adjustment of prices in markets towards equilibrium (where supply and demand equal) gives them greater utilitarian significance. The activities of entrepreneurs make prices more accurate in terms of how they represent the marginal utility of consumers. Prices act as guides to the planning of production. Those who plan production use prices to decide which lines of production should be expanded or curtailed.

Entrepreneurs lack the profit motive to take risks under socialism and so are far less likely to attempt to supply consumer demands. Without the price system to match consumer utility to incentives for production, or even indicate those utilities "without providing incentives", state planners are much less likely to invest in new ideas to satisfy consumers' desires.

Coherent planning 
The fourth condition for successful economic calculation is plan coordination among those who plan production. The problem of planning production is the knowledge problem explained by Hayek (1937, 1945), but first mentioned and illustrated by his mentor Mises in Socialism (1922), not to be mistaken with Socialism: An Economic and Sociological Analysis (1951). The planning could either be done in a decentralised fashion, requiring some mechanism to make the individual plans coherent, or centrally, requiring a lot of information.

Within capitalism, the overall plan for production is composed of individual plans from capitalists in large and small enterprises. Since capitalists purchase labour and capital out of the same common pool of available yet scarce labor and capital, it is essential that their plans fit together in at least a semi-coherent fashion. Hayek (1937) defined an efficient planning process as one where all decision makers form plans that contain relevant data from the plans from others. Entrepreneurs acquire data on the plans from others through the price system. The price system is an indispensable communications network for plan coordination among entrepreneurs. Increases and decreases in prices inform entrepreneurs about the general economic situation, to which they must adjust their own plans.

As for socialism, Mises (1944) and Hayek (1937) insisted that bureaucrats in individual ministries could not coordinate their plans without a price system. If decentralized socialism cannot work, central authorities must plan production. However, central planners face the local knowledge problem in forming a comprehensive plan for production. Mises and Hayek saw centralization as inevitable in socialism. Opponents argued that in principle an economy can be seen as a set of equations. Thus, there should be no need for prices. Using information about available resources and the preferences of people, it should be possible to calculate an optimal solution for resource allocation. Friedrich von Hayek responded that the system of equations required too much information that would not be easily available and the ensuing calculations would be too difficult. This is partly because individuals possess useful knowledge but do not realise its importance, may have no incentive to transmit the information, or may have incentive to transmit false information about their preferences. He contended that the only rational solution is to utilize all the dispersed knowledge in the market place through the use of price signals. The early debates were made before the much greater calculating powers of modern computers became available but also before research on chaos theory. In the 1980s, Alexander Nove argued that the calculations would take millions of years even with the best computers. It may be impossible to make long-term predictions for a highly complex system such as an economy.

Hayek (1935, 1937, 1940, 1945) stressed the knowledge problem of central planning, partly because decentralized socialism seemed indefensible. Part of the reason that Hayek stressed the knowledge problem was also because he was mainly concerned with debating the proposal for market socialism and the Lange model by Oskar R. Lange (1938) and Hayek's student Abba Lerner (1934, 1937, 1938) which was developed in response to the calculation argument. Lange and Lerner conceded that prices were necessary in socialism. Lange and Lerner thought that socialist officials could simulate some markets (mainly spot markets) and the simulation of spot markets was enough to make socialism reasonably efficient. Lange argued that prices can be seen merely as an accounting practice. In principle, claim market socialists, socialist managers of state enterprises could use a price system, as an accounting system, in order to minimize costs and convey information to other managers. However, while this can deal with existing stocks of goods, providing a basis for values can be ascertained, it does not deal with the investment in new capital stocks. Hayek responded by arguing that the simulation of markets in socialism would fail due to a lack of genuine competition and entrepreneurship. Central planners would still have to plan production without the aid of economically meaningful prices. Lange and Lerner also admitted that socialism would lack any simulation of financial markets, and that this would cause problems in planning capital investment.

However, Hayek's argumentation is not only regarding computational complexity for the central planners. He further argues that much of the information individuals have cannot be collected or used by others. First, individuals may have no or little incentive to share their information with central or even local planners. Second, the individual may not be aware that he has valuable information; and when he becomes aware, it is only useful for a limited time, too short for it to be communicated to the central or local planners. Third, the information is useless to other individuals if it is not in a form that allows for meaningful comparisons of value (i.e. money prices as a common basis for comparison). Therefore, Hayek argues, individuals must acquire data through prices in real markets.

Financial markets 
The fifth condition for successful economic calculation is the existence of well functioning financial markets. Economic efficiency depends heavily upon avoiding errors in capital investment. The costs of reversing errors in capital investment are potentially large. This is not just a matter of rearranging or converting capital goods that are found to be of little use. The time spent reconfiguring the structure of production is time lost in the production of consumer goods. Those who plan capital investment must anticipate future trends in consumer demand if they are to avoid investing too much in some lines of production and too little in other lines of production.

Capitalists plan production for profit. Capitalists use prices to form expectations that determine the composition of capital accumulation, the pattern of investment across industry. Those who invest in accordance with consumers' desires are rewarded with profits, those who do not are forced to become more efficient or go out of business.

Prices in futures markets play a special role in economic calculation. Futures markets develop prices for commodities in future time periods. It is in futures markets that entrepreneurs sort out plans for production based on their expectations. Futures markets are a link between entrepreneurial investment decisions and household consumer decisions. Since most goods are not explicitly traded in futures markets, substitute markets are needed. The stock market serves as a ‘continuous futures market’ that evaluates entrepreneurial plans for production (Lachmann 1978). Generally speaking, the problem of economic calculation is solved in financial markets as Mises argued:

The existence of financial markets is a necessary condition for economic calculation. The existence of financial markets itself does not automatically imply that entrepreneurial speculation will tend towards efficiency. Mises argued that speculation in financial markets tends towards efficiency because of a "trial and error" process. Entrepreneurs who commit relatively large errors in investment waste their funds over expanding some lines of production at the cost of other more profitable ventures where consumer demand is higher. The entrepreneurs who commit the worst errors by forming the least accurate expectations of future consumer demands incur financial losses. Financial losses remove these inept entrepreneurs from positions of authority in industry.

Entrepreneurs who commit smaller errors by anticipating consumer demand more correctly attain greater financial success. The entrepreneurs who form the most accurate opinions regarding the future state of markets (i.e. new trends in consumer demands) earn the highest profits and gain greater control of industry. Those entrepreneurs who anticipate future market trends therefore waste the least amount of real capital and find the most favorable terms for finance on markets for financial capital. Minimal waste of real capital goods implies the minimization of the opportunity costs of capital's economic calculation. The value of capital goods is brought into line with the value of future consumer goods through competition in financial markets, because competition for profits among capitalist financiers rewards entrepreneurs who value capital more correctly (i.e. anticipating future prices more correctly) and eliminates capitalists who value capital least correctly. To sum things up, the use of money in trading all goods (capital/labor and consumer) in all markets (spot and financial) combined with profit driven entrepreneurship and Darwinian natural selection in financial markets all combine to make rational economic calculation and allocation the outcome of the capitalist process.

Mises insisted that socialist calculation is impossible because socialism precludes the exchange of capital goods in terms of a generally accepted medium of exchange, or money. Investment in financial markets determines the capital structure of modern industry with some degree of efficiency. The egalitarian nature of socialism prohibits speculation in financial markets. Therefore, Mises concluded that socialism lacks any clear tendency towards improvement in the capital structure of industry.

Example 
Mises gave the example of choosing between producing wine or oil, making the following point:

Such intermediate products would include land, warehouse storage, bottles, barrels, oil, transport, etc. Not only would these things have to be assembled, but they would have to compete with the attainment of other economic goals. Without pricing for capital goods, essentially, Mises is arguing, it is impossible to know what their rational/most efficient use is. Investment is particularly impossible as the potential future outputs cannot be measured by any current standard, let alone a monetary one required for economic calculation. The value consumers have for current consumption over future consumption cannot be expressed, quantified or implemented as investment is independent from savings.

Criticism

Efficiency of markets 
Some academics and economists argue that the claim a free market is an efficient, or even the most efficient, method of resource allocation is incorrect. Alexander Nove argued that Mises "tends to spoil his case by the implicit assumption that capitalism and optimum resource allocation go together" in Mises' "Economic Calculation in the Socialist Commonwealth". Joan Robinson argued that many prices in modern capitalism are effectively "administered prices" created by "quasi monopolies", thus challenging the connection between capital markets and rational resource allocation. Robin Hahnel argued that free markets are in fact systematically inefficient because externalities are pervasive and because real-world markets are rarely truly competitive or in equilibrium. Socialist market abolitionists argue that whilst advocates of capitalism and the Austrian School in particular recognize equilibrium prices do not exist, they nonetheless claim that these prices can be used as a rational basis when this is not the case, hence markets are not efficient.

Joseph Schumpeter argued that large firms generally drive economic advancement through innovation and investment and so their proliferation is not necessarily bad. In countries with protectionist policies, foreign competition cannot fulfill this role, but the threat of potential competition, namely that as companies abuse their position new rivals could emerge and gain customers dissatisfied with the old companies, can still reduce the inefficiencies. Milton Friedman agreed that markets with monopolistic competition are not efficient, but he argued that in countries with free trade the pressure from foreign competition would make monopolies behave in a competitive manner.

Economic liberals and libertarian capitalists adamantly oppose any distortion of market structure by the introduction of government influence, asserting that such interference would be a form of central planning or state capitalism, insofar as it would redirect decision making from the private to the public sector. These libertarian capitalist analysts argue that monopolies and big business are not generally the result of a free market, or that they never arise from a free market; rather, they say that such concentration is enabled by governmental grants of franchises or privileges.

Equilibrium 
Allin Cottrell, Paul Cockshott and Greg Michaelson argued that the contention that finding a true economic equilibrium is not just hard but impossible for a central planner applies equally well to a market system. As any universal Turing machine can do what any other Turing machine can, a central calculator in principle has no advantage over a system of dispersed calculators, i.e. a market, or vice versa.

In some economic models, finding an equilibrium is hard, and finding an Arrow–Debreu equilibrium is PPAD-complete. If the market can find an equilibrium in polynomial time, then the equivalence above can be used to prove that P=PPAD. This line of argument thus attempts to show that any claim to impossibility must necessarily involve a local knowledge problem, because the planning system is no less capable than the market if given full information.

Don Lavoie makes a local knowledge argument by taking this implication in reverse. The market socialists pointed out the formal similarity between the neoclassical model of Walrasian general equilibrium and that of market socialism which simply replace the Walrasian auctioneer with a planning board. According to Lavoie, this emphasizes the shortcomings of the model. By relying on this formal similarity, the market socialists must adopt the simplifying assumptions of the model. The model assumes that various sorts of information are given to the auctioneer or planning board. However, if not coordinated by a capital market, this information exists in a fundamentally distributed form, unavailable to the planners. If the planners somehow captured this information, it would immediately become stale and relatively useless, unless reality somehow imitated the changeless monotony of the equilibrium model. The existence and usability of this information depends on its creation and situation within a distributed discovery procedure.

Scale of problem 
One criticism is that proponents of the theory overstate the strength of their case by describing socialism as impossible rather than inefficient. In explaining why he is not an Austrian School economist, anarcho-capitalist economist Bryan Caplan argues that while the economic calculation problem is a problem for socialism, he denies that Mises has shown it to be fatal or that it is this particular problem that led to the collapse of authoritarian socialist states. Caplan also states the exaggeration of the problem; in his view, Mises did not manage to prove why economic calculation made the socialist economy 'impossible', and even if there were serious doubts about the efficiency of cost benefit analysis, other arguments are plentiful (Caplan gives the example of the incentive problem).

Steady-state economy 
Joan Robinson argued that in a steady-state economy there would be an effective abundance of means of production and so markets would not be needed. Mises acknowledged such a theoretical possibility in his original tract when he said the following: "The static state can dispense with economic calculation. For here the same events in economic life are ever recurring; and if we assume that the first disposition of the static socialist economy follows on the basis of the final state of the competitive economy, we might at all events conceive of a socialist production system which is rationally controlled from an economic point of view." However, he contended that stationary conditions never prevail in the real world. Changes in economic conditions are inevitable; and even if they were not, the transition to socialism would be so chaotic as to preclude the existence of such a steady-state from the start.

The purpose of the price mechanism is to allow individuals to recognise the opportunity cost of decisions. In a state of abundance, there is no such cost, which is to say that in situations where one need not economize, economics does not apply, e.g. areas with abundant fresh air and water. Otto Neurath and Hillel Ticktin argued that with detailed use of real unit accounting and demand surveys a planned economy could operate without a capital market in a situation of abundance.

Use of technology 
In Towards a New Socialism'''s "Information and Economics: A Critique of Hayek" and "Against Mises", Paul Cockshott and Allin Cottrell argued that the use of computational technology now simplifies economic calculation and allows planning to be implemented and sustained. Len Brewster replied to this by arguing that Towards a New Socialism establishes what is essentially another form of a market economy, making the following point:

In response, Cockshott argued that the economic system is sufficiently far removed from a capitalist free-market economy to not count as one, saying:

Leigh Phillips' and Michal Rozworski's 2019 book The People's Republic of Walmart argues that multinational corporations like Walmart and Amazon already operate centrally planned economies larger than the Soviet Union, proving that the economic calculation problem is surmountable.

 See also 

 Decentralized planning (economics)
 Economic planning
 Enrico Barone
 Input-output model
 Lange model
 Local knowledge problem
 Market socialism
 New Economic Policy
 Otto Neurath
 Post-scarcity economy
 Production for use
 Real prices and ideal prices
 Red Plenty Self-managed economy
 Socialism
 Socialist calculation debate
 Socialization (economics)
 Tax choice
 Transition economy

 References 

 Bibliography 
 Boettke, Peter 1990 The Political Economy of Soviet Socialism.
 Caldwell, B: 1997. Hayek and Socialism The Journal of Economic Literature V35 pp. 1856–1890.
 Cottrell, Allin and Cockshott W. Paul "Calculation, Complexity and Planning: The Socialist Calculation Debate Once Again" Review of Political Economy
 Cox, Robin 2005, "The Economic Calculation Controversy: Unravelling of a Myth".
 Dickinson H. D. 1933 Price Formation in a Socialist Community in The Economic Journal.
 Dickinson, H. D. 1939 The Economics of Socialism.
 Hayek, F. A. 1935 Collectivist Economic Planning.
 Hayek F. A. 1937 Economics and Knowledge Economica V4 N13 pp. 33–54.
 Hayek F. A. 1940 The Competitive "Solution" Economica V7 N26 pp. 125–149.
 Hayek, F. A. The Road to Serfdom.
 Hayek, F. A. 1945 "The Use of Knowledge in Society" The American Economic Review.
 Hayek, F. A. 1952 The Counter Revolution of Science.
  
  
  
 Lachmann, L: 1978 Capital and Its Structure. Sheed, Andrews, and McMeel, Kansas City.
  
  
  
 Lange, Oscar 1967 The Computer and the Market in Socialism, Capitalism, and Economic Growth Feinstein Ed.
 Lavoie, Don: 1981. A Critique of the Standard Account of the Socialist Calculation Debate Journal of Libertarian Studies N5 V1 pp. 41-87.
  
  
  
 
 MacKenzie, D. W. 2006 "Oskar Lange and the Impossibility of Economic Calculation". Studia Economicze.
 Mises L. E. 1912 The Theory of Money and Credit.
 Mises L. E. 1920 Economic Calculation in the Socialist Commonwealth, reprinted in Hayek (1935).
 Mises L. E. 1922 [1936] Socialism: An Economic and Sociological Analysis.
 Mises 1933 Planned Economy and Socialism; reprinted in Selected Writings of Ludwig von Mises, The Liberty Fund (2002) Richard M Ebeling ed.
 Mises L. E. 1944 Bureaucracy.
 Mises L. E. 1944 Omnipotent Government.
 Mises L. E. 1949 Human Action.
 Mises L. E. 1957 Theory and History.
 Roemer, John (1994). A Future for Socialism, Verso Press.
 Rothbard, M. N. 1991. The End of Socialism and the Calculation Debate Revisited. The Review of Austrian Economics.
 Spufford, Francis. 2010 Red Plenty'', Faber & Faber.
 Stiglitz, J: 1994. Whither Socialism? MIT Press.
 Vaughn, Karen. 1980. Economic Calculation under Socialism: The Austrian Contribution. Economic Inquiry 18 pp. 535–554.
 Yunker, James A. "Post-Lange Market Socialism" 1995, Journal of Economic Issues.

Austrian School
Comparative economic systems
Criticisms of economics
Economic planning
Economic problems
History of economic thought
Management cybernetics
Socialism

fr:Ludwig von Mises#Le calcul économique et l'économie socialiste